Maze Creek is a stream in southeast Cedar and northeast Dade counties in southwest Missouri.

The stream source is southeast of Dadeville. The stream flows north passing under Missouri Route W between Dadeville and Knox in southwestern Polk County. It then turns northwest passing under Missouri Route 245 between Dadeville and Bona and enters an arm of Stockton Lake passing under Missouri Route 215 west of Bona. Variant names include Arbell Creek and Turkey Creek.

Maze Creek has the name of the local Maze family.

See also
List of rivers of Missouri

References

Rivers of Cedar County, Missouri
Rivers of Dade County, Missouri
Rivers of Missouri